Ingrid Bachmann (born 1958) is a Canadian contemporary artist based in Montreal known mostly for her interactive kinetic sculptures that mix technology and ordinary everyday objects. Her work has been exhibited throughout Canada, and internationally in the United States, Peru, Brazil, Germany, Belgium, Scotland, Australia and Cuba. Exhibitions include the 11th Havana Biennial (Cuba), the Quebec Biennial, Manifestation d’art International 6 (Canada), Flesh of the World (Canada), Command Z: Artists Exploring Phenomena and Technology (USA), and Lab 30 (Germany).

About
Ingrid Bachmann is known for her multidisciplinary installation works, drawing from the fields of textiles, sculpture and kinetic art. Her work frequently incorporates technology. But as J.R. Carpenter  points out: "Much of Bachmann’s work with technology has been aimed at demystifying it, humanizing it, stripping it down to its essentials, and then hanging stories on those bare bones. She has used bits of yarn to map the internet’s under-sea cables, harnessed the computer loom to 'print' seismic activity, offered giant knitting needles as a user-computer interface."

In an article in Canadian Art Magazine Terence Sharpe writes: "Ingrid Bachmann’s work can be read as a mapping of social and technological evolutions. It attempts to harness the alienation of new media and return it to more corporeal base."

Bachmann’s artist biography for the Sydney, Australia exhibition (2016) "The Patient" describes her work as existing "at the crossroads of the technological, the generative, the performative and the corporeal."

Selected works

Symphony for 54 Shoes (Distant Echoes) "is a kinetic artwork that involves 27 pairs of shoes collected from a variety of second hand and thrift stores. Each shoe has a toe and heel tap used in tap dancing attached to it. The shoes move or dance independently of each other. The mechanical motion of tapping is created using solenoids (tubular magnetic sensors) that move up and down when activated by a switch. Each switch, 52 in total, is controlled by a microcontroller and software that activates the sequence of the tapping of the shoes."

Pelt (Bestiary) – "I have often had the sense that technology is naked, that it has drifted from its animal roots. In Pelt (Bestiary), I want to give digital technology back its fur: to bring the bestial and the messiness of the world back into the realm of digital technology and to continue my work in grounding the digital experience in the material realm and to rethink the human//machine/animal divides.
Pelt (Bestiary) is a series of six kinetic and interactive sculptures and five large format drawings that serve as portraits of the beasts. Each piece has its own character and behaviour - some respond to human presence, others move of their own accord."

Portable Sublime – In this installation Ingrid Bachmann uses suitcases to let viewers enter "spaces of provisional wonder. Various events occur when the suitcases are opened. Each suitcase is its own small-scale installation with its own narrative."

Pinocchio’s Dilemma explores the "uneasy relationship between the telling of stories and the telling of lies. I am interested in the stories we tell, as individuals and as cultures, and the intersection between lies and stories, fact and fiction. Components include a growing nose and a series of wagging jewel-like tongues."

Selected exhibitions
Angry Work - Mensonges et colère, Galerie Art Mûr, Montreal, Canada, 2017 

Hybrid Bodies, Kunstkraftwerk, Leipzig, Germany, 2016 

Counterpoint, Galerie Art Mûr, Montreal, Canada, 2015 

Hearts and Minds, Hannah Maclure Centre, Dundee, Scotland, 2015 

Flesh of the World, Doris McCarthy Gallery, Toronto, Canada, 2015 

Despertar/Éveil/Alive, Groupe Molior/Sesc Santana, São Paulo, Brazil, 2014 

Havana Biennial, Havana, Cuba, 2012 

Quebec Biennial, Manif d’art, 2012 

Lab 30, Augsburg, Germany, 2010 

Transit/Transitions, Galerie du Centro Cultural Pontificia Universidad Catolica del Peru, Lima, 2007 

Zoo, Interaccess Gallery, Toronto, Canada, 2007 

Portable Sublime, Optica Gallery, Montreal, Canada, 2003 

Hôpital, Galerie Articule, Montreal, Canada, 2001 

A Nomad Web: Sleeping Beauty Wakes Up, Walter Phillips Gallery, Banff, Canada, 1993-95 

Berlin Stories, The Banff Centre, Or Gallery, Textile Museum, Canada, 1991-3

Other
Bachmann is a Professor of Studio Art at Concordia University. in Montreal. She was a founding member of Hexagram: Institute for Research and Creation in the Media Arts and is the Director of the Institute of Everyday Life. Before Concordia she taught at the Art Institute of Chicago.

Bachmann is also a writer and editor.  She is the co-editor of Material Matters (YYZ Books, 1998, 1999, 2011) and has contributed essays to several anthologies and periodicals including The Object of Labor, MIT Press 2007.

She has given invited talks at such venues as the Banff Center for the Arts, ISEA (The International Symposium of Electronic Arts), Goldsmiths College (University of London), University of Wollongong, Australia, and the University of Maryland at Baltimore, The School of the Art Institute of Chicago, among others.

References

External links

Ingrid Bachmann on Vimeo
Hybrid Bodies Project
Ingrid Bachmann on Artsy

1958 births
Canadian installation artists
Women installation artists
Canadian contemporary artists
Living people
Academic staff of Concordia University
Artists from Montreal
Canadian academics of fine arts
Canadian women artists
Canadian sculptors